Chymnayi (Çımnaayı) is a rural locality (a selo), the only inhabited locality, and the administrative center of Ust-Amginsky Rural Okrug of Tattinsky District in the Sakha Republic, Russia, located  from Ytyk-Kyuyol, the administrative center of the district. Its population as of the 2010 Census was 573, down from 594 recorded during the 2002 Census.

References

Notes

Sources
Official website of the Sakha Republic. Registry of the Administrative-Territorial Divisions of the Sakha Republic. Tattinsky District. 

Rural localities in Tattinsky District